The 2009 Asian Speed Skating Championships were held between 4 January and 5 January 2009 at the Tomakomai Highland Sports Center in Tomakomai, Hokkaidō.

Women championships 
Allround

Day 1

Day 2

Allround Results 

Single distances

Single distances results

Men championships

Day 1

Day 2

Allround Results

References
www.skatingjapan.jp 

Asian Speed Skating Championships
2009 in speed skating
International speed skating competitions hosted by Japan
Sport in Hokkaido
Asian Speed Skating Championships